ApolloCon was a science fiction convention held annually in Houston, Texas by the Houston Science Fiction Association (HSFA), a non-profit 501(c)3 corporation.

ApolloCon offers information and entertainment for fans of science fiction, fantasy, horror, and other genres of speculative and imaginative fiction in all their forms, including literary, media, and interactive gaming.

Programming
ApolloCon offers discussion panels on literary, media, science and culture topics.  These include several discussions that focus on space exploration and astronomy, drawing participants from Houston's space sciences industries and other groups.

In addition to its discussion panels, ApolloCon hosts an exhibition hall for vendors of books and other merchandise, an art show and auction, a full schedule of LARP, gaming, filk music, video programming, a judged masquerade, plus networking opportunities for clubs and individual fans. Guests are typically writers and editors, artists, scientists, musicians, actors, and fans in the fields of science fiction, fantasy, and horror.

Past conventions
 2004 (June 25–26)
 Guest of Honor: Selina Rosen
 Artist Guest of Honor: Cat Osborne
 Science Guests of Honor: Paul Abell and Bonnie Cooper
 Convention chair: Doug Herrington
 2005 (June 24–26)
 Guest of Honor: Robert J. Sawyer
 Artist Guest of Honor: Victory
 Filk Guest of Honor: Juanita Coulson
 Fan Guests of Honor: Kathy Thornton and Derly N. Ramirez II
 Convention chair: Doug Herrington
 2006 (June 23–25)
 Guest of Honor: Peter S. Beagle
 Artist Guest of Honor: Alain Viesca
 Filk Guest of Honor: Steve Macdonald
 Fan Guest of Honor: Tim Miller
 Special Guest: Greg Edmonson
 Special Guest: David Franklin
 Convention chair: Mark Hall
 2007 (June 22–24)
 Guest of Honor: C.S. Friedman
 Editor Guest of Honor: David G. Hartwell
 Artist Guest of Honor: Jeff Sturgeon
 Filk Guests of Honor: Graham and Becca Leathers
 Fan Guest of Honor: A.T. Campbell, III
 Convention chair: Mark Hall
 2008 (June 27–29)
 Guest of Honor: Allen Steele
 Editor Guest of Honor: Lou Anders
 Artist Guest of Honor: Brad Foster
 Filk Guest of Honor: Margaret Middleton
 Fan Guest of Honor: Anne KG Murphy
 Convention chair: Shai Mohammed
 2009 (June 26–28)
 Guest of Honor: Wil McCarthy
 Editor Guest of Honor: (unable to attend)
 Artist Guest of Honor: Pat Rawlings
 Music Guest of Honor: Amy McNally
 Fan Guest of Honor: Al Jackson
 Special Guest: Stanley G. Love
 Convention chair: Kim Kofmel
 2010 (June 25–27)
 Guest of Honor: Catherine Asaro
 Artist Guest of Honor: Keith Thompson
 Fan Guest of Honor: Pat Virzi
 Music Guest of Honor: Dave Weingart
 Special Guest: Rob Balder of Erfworld
 Convention chair: Kim Kofmel
 2011 (June 24–26)
 Guest of Honor: Martha Wells
 Artist Guest of Honor: [Rocky Kelley ]
 Editor Guest of Honor: Ann VanderMeer
 Fan Guest of Honor: Jeanne Gomoll
 Convention chair: Katy Pace
 2012 (June 22–24)
 Guest of Honor: Tanya Huff
 Artist Guest of Honor: Jael
 Fan Guest of Honor: Candace Pulleine (in memoriam)
 Convention Chair: Jonathan Guthrie

Community participation
ApolloCon is largely conducted by and for local fan based communities which are in turn interwoven with each other.  The motto "We are them and they are us" is often used to describe the inter-relationship. Notable organizations that have participated in past ApolloCons include Artist Trading Cards, Bayou City Browncoats, Houston Costume Group, Houston Sci-Fi Video, Houston SF & Fantasy Writers, Houston SF Book Exchange Network, Houston SF Ritual Breakfast, Inklings Roundtable of Houston, Several Unlimited, SF Writers Meetup, South Texas Squad of the 501st Legion, Space City Trade Federation, Star Trek Houston, Starbase Houston, USS Firebird NCC-74919, and USS SpiritWolf NCC-74300.

References

External links
 ApolloCon official website
 ApolloCon LiveJournal news and discussion forum
 Houston SF Ritual Breakfast main page 

Culture of Houston
Defunct science fiction conventions in the United States
Conventions in Houston
2004 establishments in Texas
Recurring events established in 2004
Tourist attractions in Houston
501(c)(3) organizations